WFAE (90.7 MHz) is a non-commercial public radio station in Charlotte, North Carolina. It is the main NPR news and information member in the Charlotte region. The station's main studios and offices are at One University Place in the University City neighborhood of northeast Charlotte.  A satellite studio is at Spirit Square on North College Street in downtown Charlotte.

WFAE has an effective radiated power (ERP) of 100,000 watts, the maximum for non-grandfathered FM stations.  The transmitter is located in northeastern Mecklenburg County.  WFAE broadcasts using HD Radio technology.  Its HD-2 digital subchannel has a jazz format and its HD-3 subchannel carries the Public Radio Exchange (PRX) Remix.

Programming
On weekdays, WFAE has all news and information programming.  It carries NPR's national shows such as Morning Edition, All Things Considered, Fresh Air with Terry Gross, 1A, Here and Now, The Takeaway and Marketplace, along with the BBC World Service heard overnight.  WFAE produces an hour-long weekday call-in program, Charlotte Talks with Mike Collins, heard live at 9 a.m. and repeated at 7 p.m.  Frequent news updates come from NPR and the WFAE news staff.

On weekends, WFAE features specialty programs.  Weekly NPR shows include Wait, Wait, Don't Tell Me, This American Life, Ask Me Another, The TED Radio Hour, On The Media and The New Yorker Radio Hour.  Sunday evenings include the New Age music and Electronica show Echoes.

History

Student-run station
On April 18, 1977, WFAE first signed on the air. It was the student radio service of the University of North Carolina at Charlotte, broadcasting classical music and jazz.  It was originally on 90.9 MHz from a 10-watt transmitter atop the library building. It succeeded a student-run carrier current station known as "WVFN" (Voice of the Forty Niners), which operated from the basement of the Cone University Center. As of 1976, the station had reduced the amount of Top 40 music and increased jazz programming.

The outlet was limited by its small budget, $25,000 a year, all collected from UNCC student fees. Its signal was limited to only the campus and surrounding neighborhoods of northeastern Charlotte and Mecklenburg County.

NPR affiliation
Charlotte was one of the largest markets in the South without an NPR member station until South Carolina Educational Radio outlet WPRV (now WNSC-FM) launched from a transmitter at Rock Hill on January 3, 1978. It initially broadcasting instructional programs during the day before beginning a full-time schedule in July.

In September 1978, WFAE secured Federal Communications Commission (FCC) approval to move to 90.7 MHz with a full 100,000 watts. However, construction of the upgraded facility was hindered by state procurement delays.

High power debut
The station went off the air on December 7, 1979, to allow construction of its full-power facility to begin. It returned at full power on June 29, 1981. On that day, it became North Carolina's third full NPR member station, alongside WFDD in the Piedmont Triad and WUNC in the Triangle.

In addition to NPR programs, the new station aired jazz during the day with classical music at night and on Sundays. Later, jazz was moved to night. The station grew rapidly, and within five years moved to larger studios in the One University Place building near the UNC Charlotte campus, where the station is still based today.

In February 1986, WFAE began airing new-age music on a Sunday evening show emphasizing contemporary jazz, featuring such artists as George Winston and Kitaro. The show was called "New Age Sunday" at first, but the station dropped that name to distance itself from the new age spiritual movement. In 1987, WFAE began broadcasting 24 hours a day and began airing more news and information programming along with more contemporary jazz, dropping classical music because WDAV played it.

Foundation control
WFAE's growth occurred amid financial uncertainty. UNC Charlotte was eventually forced to end support for the station due to a budget crunch. On  April 15, 1993, UNC Charlotte handed over control to a nonprofit community board, the University Radio Foundation, which still owns the station today.

WFAE continued to grow through the next decade. It added a satellite station in Hickory, North Carolina, WFHE, at 90.3 MHz, in 1995. WFAE's signal is spotty at best in some parts of the North Carolina Foothills. WFHE largely simulcasts WFAE, with inserts specific to the Foothills area airing during hourly news breaks.

More News, Less Music
In 1996, WFAE largely dropped music in favor of a news/talk. It was one of the first NPR stations to air NPR's midday news/talk block (The Diane Rehm Show, Fresh Air and Talk of the Nation). However, it had been committed to news long before then.

In 1998, it launched Charlotte Talks, hosted by longtime WBT host Mike Collins. Charlotte Talks is a popular local show that focuses on local issues and figures and airs live at 9 a.m. Monday through Friday. It soon became "the de facto talk show of record in Charlotte".

In November 2000, WFAE dropped its last jazz program, Jazz Tonight with Barbara Nail, which ran from 8 to midnight weekdays, replacing it with a rerun of Fresh Air, The Todd Mundt Show, and two extra hours of The World Today.

Weekend programming
While its weekday lineup consists entirely of news/talk programs provided mostly by NPR, PRI, or the BBC, music provides the basis for some of its weekend programming. On Saturday evenings from 9 pm to midnight, WFAE broadcasts 3 hours of mainstream jazz, while on Sunday evenings from 7 p.m. to midnight, WFAE carries PRI's Echoes. WFAE also used to air a locally produced Sunday evening program of new-age music called Nightscapes, but replaced that with an expanded broadcast of Echoes.

For many years, WFAE was the originating station for The Thistle & Shamrock, a popular Celtic music show from NPR that originated on WFAE when it was licensed to UNC Charlotte and its host, Fiona Ritchie, was a visiting professor at the university. It began as a local program soon after WFAE signed on, and was picked up nationally in 1983. Even after WFAE dropped most music programming from its schedule, Thistle'' remained on the schedule until 2013.

HD Radio
In 2004, WFAE became the first station in Charlotte and the first public radio station in North Carolina to broadcast using HD Radio. HD Radio was also added to WFHE.

On July 28, 2008, WFAE began airing jazz from JazzWorks on one of its HD channels to reach those disappointed by WNSC-FM joining SCETV's all-news network. Locally produced jazz shows were a possibility as well, since the station still has a large music library.

In 2012, WFAE added two low-powered translators in the Sandhills—one in Laurinburg and one in Southern Pines.

WFAE Leadership 
Current Leadership

 Ju-Don Marshall, Interim CEO, Executive Vice President and Chief Content Officer
 Richard Lancaster, President of the Board of Directors
 Nick Wharton, Vice President of the Board of Directors

Charlotte Talks

 Mike Collins, host
 Wendy Herkey, executive producer

Previous WFAE General Managers

 Robert “Bo” Pittman
 Jennifer Roth
 Jon Schwartz
 Roger Sarow
 Joe O’Connor

Previous Program Directors

 Jennifer Roth
 Paul Stribling
 Dale Spear

Awards 
WFAE has won multiple regional Edward R. Murrow Awards in the years, 2014, 2017 and 2018 and 2020. WFAE has also won Sunshine Award for Journalism in 2017.

Additional Stations
In addition to WFAE's primary 100,000 watt signal, there is one full-power station licensed to simulcast the programming of WFAE:

Translators
WFAE programming is broadcast on the following translators:

References

External links
WFAE official website
Charlotte Talks web blog

FAE
NPR member stations
Radio stations established in 1977
1977 establishments in North Carolina